Dr. William H. Pitts House is a historic home located at Abingdon, Washington County, Virginia. It was built in 1854, and is a two-story, five-bay, stuccoed masonry, Greek Revival style dwelling.  The house sits on a limestone foundation and has a gable roof with stepped-gable parapet walls flanking paired chimneys on each end.  It has a recessed entrance which features a double-leaf wood entrance door surrounded by a transom and sidelights.

It was listed on the National Register of Historic Places in 2002 and is located within the Abingdon Historic District.

References

Houses on the National Register of Historic Places in Virginia
Greek Revival houses in Virginia
Houses completed in 1854
Houses in Washington County, Virginia
National Register of Historic Places in Washington County, Virginia
Individually listed contributing properties to historic districts on the National Register in Virginia